Thomas Allen Swayze Jr. (December 8, 1930 – October 16, 2005) was an American politician in the state of Washington. He served in the Washington House of Representatives from 1965 to 1973 for District 26.

References

1930 births
2005 deaths
Republican Party members of the Washington House of Representatives